The women's team Squash event was part of the squash programme and took place between November 22 and 25, at the Asian Games Town Gymnasium.

Schedule
All times are China Standard Time (UTC+08:00)

Results

Preliminary round

Pool A

Pool B

Knockout round

Semifinals

Final

Non-participating athletes

References 

Women Team – Pool Matches
Women Team – Semi & Finals

Squash at the 2010 Asian Games